The women's team pursuit race of the 2014–15 ISU Speed Skating World Cup 3, arranged in Sportforum Hohenschönhausen, in Berlin, Germany, was held on 6 December 2014.

The Dutch team won the race, while the Polish team came second, and the Japanese team came third.

Results
The race took place on Saturday, 6 December, in the afternoon session, scheduled at 18:21.

References

Women team pursuit
3